Bukhar-zhirau Kalkaman Uli (also: Bukhar-zhyrau Qalqamanuly, ; ; 1668–1771) was a Kazakh poet at the court of the Middle Horde. His was active at the court during the reign of the Ablai Khan. Although his primary activity was law-making, poetry and singing, Kalkaman Uli also acted as an advisor to the Khan. Because of this, his poetry dealt with broader themes which included politics, the foreign policy of the horde, and the life of the Khan. Bukhar-jirau is not known to have written any epics.

References

Further reading

Gabdullin, M. G., et al., eds. (1968–1979) Istoriia kazakhskoi literatury (trans. History of Kazakh Literature). 3 vols. Almaty, Kazakhstan: Nauka.
Maghauuin, Mukhtar, ed. (1971) Aldaspan: XV–XVIII ghasyrlardaghy qazaq aqyn, zhyraularynyng shygharmalar zhyynaghy (The Scimitar: A Collection of Poems by Kazakh Aqyns and Zhyraus

1668 births
1771 deaths
Kalkaman Uly, Bukhar-Zhirau
Ethnic Kazakh people